In the life of Soviet Union, air shows were a highly regarded type of parade, almost always of military nature. They happened on various occasions and anniversaries, in many locations across the country. A notable air show was the Tushino Air Show held annually in August.

Dates

Soviet Air Fleet Day
The most frequent date of air shows was the Soviet Air Fleet Day. It was also known as the Soviet Air Forces Day, or Soviet Aviation Day. It was established in 1933 and was most usually held on the third Sunday of August, weather permitting. The initial exhibition on 18 August 1933, was a result of Yakov Alksnis initiative, and was held in Khodynka Aerodrome (the Central Moscow Aerodrome), but since the next year the show became located on Tushino airfield near Moscow, where it remained for entire decades. In 1937, the parade was attended by nearly a million people, observing the masses of aircraft spelling in the sky "LENIN", "STALIN" and "СССР". The celebrations repeated until the fall of Soviet Union, and continue in Russia (location is now Zhukovskiy airport, see MAKS airshow).

May Day

1 May was dedicated to multitude of parades throughout the Soviet Union. They often included large-scale flypasts.

Other
The Soviet Air Fleet Day became primarily associated with Soviet Air Forces (VVS), so a separate day has been established for Soviet Air Defense Forces (PVO) a second arm of Soviet military that employed numerous fighter squadrons. It was called Soviet Air Defence Forces Day, occurred on the second Sunday of April, and was celebrated with air parades of lesser scale.

The October revolution anniversary usually included air parade, but as it was held on 7 November, the aircraft were often cancelled because of weather conditions. The same problem pertained to 19 November, the Soviet Rocket Forces and Artillery Day.

Notably, the 50th anniversary of October revolution air show was held in the summer, on 9 July 1967 at Domodedovo airport. In an unprecedented display of air power, it featured twelve new types or variants of military aircraft, and prompted concern in the West.

Notable first appearances 

The Soviet air shows conveyed more than entertainment. In the atmosphere of harshly enforced clandestinity, these air shows were frequently the main source of information about the recent aviation achievements of Soviet design bureaus (OKBs). Both Eastern and Western public opinion benefited from it, as well as foreign military intelligence.

See also 
 Air show
 Flypast
 Military parade
 MAKS (air show), the current biennial Russian air show

References 

Aviation in the Soviet Union
Soviet Air Force